A shrub is a small-to-medium-sized perennial woody plant.

Shrub or Shrubs may also refer to:

Music 
 Shrub (band), American reggae, rock and rap band
 The Shrubs, English rock music group
 Shrubs (American band), American rock 'n roll band

Other uses 
 Shrub (drink), two different, but related, acidulated beverages

See also
 
 Shrubb, surname (including a list of people with the name)